Hanson Memorial High School is a private, Roman Catholic high school in Franklin, Louisiana.  It is located in the Roman Catholic Diocese of Lafayette.

History
Hanson Memorial High School began opening its doors to the youth of Franklin since 1925. Mrs. Minnie Hanson Conolly presented the main school as well as the acreage in memory of her father, Albert Hanson, and her brother, Eddie Hanson.  In 1931, Mrs. Conolly established an endowment fund dedicated to facility upkeep.  The addition of a library and cafeteria building in the early fifties and the construction of a gym/science structure in 1962 completed the facilities for the school.  The late Mrs. J. C. Blevins continued the work begun by her aunt.
In the spring of 1967, the Christian Brothers, after forty years of work in the education of boys in Franklin, withdrew from the faculty at Hanson because of a greater need in other areas of the Province.  In August 1967, St. John Academy and Hanson Memorial High School were consolidated and Hanson opened as a junior and senior coeducational high school.  The Marianites of Holy Cross, who had been at St. John since 1871, agreed to become a part of Hanson's staff.
Currently, Hanson Memorial High School educates students in grades six through twelve.  In 1999 a Capital Campaign raised nearly one million dollars. That money was used to build a modern eight room "junior high wing" to the school. In the fall of 2011 a new library was completed, dedicated to Fr. Oniell Landry. Today, Hanson Memorial is run by laymen and women of Franklin and surrounding areas.

Athletics
Hanson Memorial High athletics competes in the LHSAA. 

HMS offers nine sports for student-athletes to participate in.

Championships
Football championships
(1) State Championship: 1976

Girls' basketball championships
(1) State Championship: 1978

Championship history
HMS Athletics has tallied a total 12 team state championships in the sports of football, softball, girls' basketball and golf. Several HMS athletes have been crowned individual state champions in the sports of golf, track and field, and power-lifting.

Coaches

Football
 Richard McCloskey - LHSAA Hall of Fame Head Coach, Richard "Dick" McCloskey, won a state championship in 1976. He finished with a record of 286–141–6 and a .667 winning percentage in 39 seasons.

Girls' basketball
Girls Basketball has enjoyed long time success, especially under the direction of alumnus, Billie Jean Talbot.

Notes and references

Private high schools in Louisiana
Catholic secondary schools in Louisiana
St. Mary Parish, Louisiana
Educational institutions established in 1925
1925 establishments in Louisiana